The Coffeyville Glassblowers were a Class-D minor league baseball team based in Coffeyville, Kansas that played in the Oklahoma–Arkansas–Kansas League in 1907. The team featured Billy Kelsey and Frank Moore, who both had Major League Baseball experience. They were managed by Bill Stuart.

References

Baseball teams established in 1907
Defunct minor league baseball teams
Defunct baseball teams in Kansas
Baseball teams disestablished in 1907